Christopher George William Roper (born 20 May 1991) is an English cricketer.  Roper is a right-handed batsman who bowls right-arm fast medium pace.  He was born in Bristol.

While studying for his degree at Durham University, Roper made his first-class debut for Durham MCCU against Nottinghamshire in 2010.  He has made three further first-class appearances for the team, the last of which came against Warwickshire in 2011.  In his four first-class matches, he has taken 6 wickets at an average of 26.00, with best figures of 5/110.

References

External links
Chris Roper at ESPNcricinfo
Chris Roper at CricketArchive

1991 births
Living people
Cricketers from Bristol
English cricketers
Durham MCCU cricketers
Alumni of Collingwood College, Durham